Mark Edward Fischbach (born June 28, 1989), known online as Markiplier, is an American YouTuber. Originally from Honolulu, Hawaii, he began his career in Cincinnati, Ohio, and is currently based in Los Angeles, California. In addition to uploading videos on his main YouTube channel, he is a co-founder of clothing company Cloak with fellow YouTuber Jacksepticeye and a co-host of the Distractible podcast alongside LordMinion777 and Muyskerm. He also co-hosted the now defunct Unus Annus channel.

, his channel has over 19 billion video views and 34 million subscribers. Fischbach specializes in Let's Play videos, commonly of survival horror video games.

YouTube career

Channel format

Fischbach has collaborated on sketch comedy and gaming videos with a number of fellow YouTubers, including CrankGameplays, Jacksepticeye, LordMinion777, Muyskerm, PewDiePie, Matthias, Game Grumps, Cyndago, Yamimash, jacksfilms, CaptainSparklez, Egoraptor and LixianTV, who currently works as his editor. He has also collaborated with celebrities such as Jack Black and Jimmy Kimmel.

A recurring staple of Fischbach's channel are charity live streams, which feature him playing games while campaigning and collecting donations for various charities, including Cincinnati Children's Hospital Medical Center, the Depression and Bipolar Support Alliance, and Best Friends Animal Society.

History

Early years and growth (2012–2014)
Fischbach first joined YouTube on March 6, 2012, creating a channel under the username "Markiplier", and uploaded his first video on April 4, 2012. Fischbach's original intent for the channel was sketch comedy where he would be portraying all of the characters in the sketches. This led to the creation of the name "Markiplier", a portmanteau of Mark and multiplier. Fischbach's first series was a playthrough of the video game Amnesia: The Dark Descent. After playing several other game series, including Penumbra and Dead Space, YouTube banned Fischbach's AdSense account, and he created a new channel on May 26, 2012, markiplierGAME.

In 2014, the MarkiplierGAME channel was listed on NewMediaRockstars Top 100 Channels, ranked at number 61. That year, Fischbach announced he was planning to move to Los Angeles, California to be closer to other resources for his channel, such as the YouTube Space and other content creators. In August 2014, Fischbach began his famous Five Nights at Freddy's playthrough, which became his most popular playthrough to date, the first part having over 100 million views as of February 2022. Due to the success of this series, Fischbach played the other games in the FNAF franchise, and also had a cameo in Five Nights at Freddy's AR: Special Delivery.

Fischbach and fellow YouTuber Jenna Mae appeared on Jimmy Kimmel Live! in September 2015 following backlash Kimmel received regarding jokes he made about YouTube and Let's Play videos. In 2015, he was rated sixth in a list of the twenty most influential celebrities among teenagers in the United States.

Hiatus and breaking 10 million subscribers (2015)

Beginning in 2015, Fischbach lived with fellow YouTubers Daniel Kyre and Ryan Magee, who created and ran the YouTube sketch comedy and music channel Cyndago. Matt Watson from Kids w/ Problems later joined Cyndago after they moved to Los Angeles. Their work was noted for having unexpected endings and dark, often disturbing, humor. Cyndago disbanded following the death of Daniel Kyre. At the time of their disbandment, the group had made forty sketches and fourteen original songs, many of them featuring Fischbach. After the death of Daniel Kyre and disbandment of Cyndago, Fischbach temporarily went on hiatus from September 17, 2015, to October 5, 2015. He returned and reached 10 million subscribers on October 15, 2015.

Continued growth and larger projects (2015–2019)
Fischbach co-hosted the 2015 South by Southwest Gaming Awards with The Legend of Korra voice actor Janet Varney, and was featured in YouTube Rewind.

Throughout 2016, Fischbach turned some of his focus to comedy sketches, showing his aspiration for improvisational theatre. In 2017, Fischbach posted an interactive Choose Your Own Adventure-style video titled A Date with Markiplier, which was well received by fans. On March 29, 2018, Fischbach announced his YouTube channel had surpassed 20 million subscribers.

In October 2019, Fischbach announced a new Choose Your Own Adventure-style story similar to A Date With Markiplier, a YouTube Originals production titled A Heist with Markiplier. Produced by Fischbach and Rooster Teeth, the series contains 31 possible endings and features other YouTubers such as Rosanna Pansino, Matthew Patrick, and Game Grumps.

Unus Annus (2019–2020)
On November 15, 2019, Fischbach launched a new channel with fellow YouTuber Ethan Nestor (known online as CrankGameplays) called Unus Annus, a channel which planned to upload a video every day for one year, after which the channel would be deleted along with its videos. The channel rose to early success, gaining 1 million subscribers in its first 5 days and 4.56 million in its last few minutes, and over 11.5 million video views in its first week. Following a final 12-hour live stream that peaked at over 1.5 million concurrent viewers, the channel was deleted by Fischbach and Nestor on November 14, 2020, at 12:00 a.m. PST.

Other ventures
Fischbach joined the board of comic book publisher Red Giant Entertainment in November 2014. In June of that year at the San Diego Comic-Con, he co-hosted a panel with figures from the company including CEO Benny R. Powell, and writers David Campiti, Mort Castle, David Lawrence, and Brian Augustyn. In 2016, it was announced that he would appear in his own line of comics.

Fischbach signed with Endeavor in late 2016, having expressed interest in branching out from YouTube content.

Since 2017, he has voiced the character 5.0.5 in the Cartoon Network series Villainous.

Podcasting and streaming
Fischbach, along with Wade Barnes (LordMinion777) and Bob Muyskens (Muyskerm) streamed a podcast on Twitch called 3 Peens in a Podcast from 2018 to 2021, where the trio discussed current events and played multiplayer games.

In 2019, Fischbach co-produced and starred in The Edge of Sleep, an episodic audio drama released on iTunes which follows a night watchman and a group of survivors in a world where those who fell asleep suddenly died.

In May 2021, Fischbach announced that he, Barnes, and Muyskens would be launching a podcast called Distractible. The podcast is prerecorded and produced by QCode's label Wood Elf, and streams on Spotify and Apple Podcasts. Within a week of its debut, its first episode rose to No. 1 on the Spotify and Apple Podcast charts. In February 2022, he launched another podcast co-hosted by Tyler Schield, named Go! My Favorite Sports Team, which also became the No. 1 ranked sports-related podcast on Spotify.

Cloak
In 2018, Markiplier announced the launch of a new fashion brand called Cloak, in a joint venture with Jacksepticeye. The brand was envisioned and launched as a gamer-focused athleisure line distinct from their personal merchandise. The brand has released collaborations with Mojang Studios, Five Nights at Freddy's, and The Oregon Trail.

In 2020, fellow YouTuber and streamer Pokimane joined Cloak as a partner and creative director.

Philanthropy
Fischbach has participated in multiple charity live streams and fundraisers. The majority of his fundraising has been for cancer charities in honor of his father, who died of lung cancer in 2008.
In 2017, Forbes reported that Fischbach and his fans raised around $3 million for charity through these events. In March 2018, in celebration of reaching 20 million subscribers, Fischbach announced he would donate all proceeds from a 48-hour sale of his "Tasteful Nudes" Charity Calendar to the Cancer Research Institute; he raised over $490,000 for the charity and won the 2020 Oliver R. Grace Award.

OnlyFans
The success of the Tasteful Nudes Calendar inspired Fischbach to start an account on OnlyFans, whose proceeds will be split evenly between the Cincinnati Children's Hospital and the World Food Programme. He announced a set of conditions that had to be met first before launching the page: The first condition was that his Distractible podcast had to become the most popular podcast on Apple Podcast and Spotify, the second condition was that a sports podcast he created with a friend had to become the most popular sports podcast in the United States and the rest of the world. The third and final condition was that fans had to pay an admission of $12 for his documentary Markiplier From North Korea, a documentary based on his mother's life story about him getting back in touch with the rest of his family.

The conditions were met faster than he was prepared for. On November 2, 2022, he announced in a YouTube video that he was going to create the page at the end of the month, after making an initial batch of "tasteful nudes" and getting the username from someone who was impersonating him.

The page was launched on December 9, 2022, and the influx of traffic caused the site to crash.

Personal life

Mark Edward Fischbach was born on June 28, 1989 at the Tripler Army Medical Center in Honolulu, Hawaii, to Cliffton M. Fischbach (1941–2008), a German American retired military officer and a layout artist and to Sunok Frank (born 1964), a Korean retired nurse. His parents met when his father was stationed in Korea. After he was born, his family moved to Cincinnati, Ohio, where he was raised. He grew up in Milford, Ohio, and attended Milford High School where he was a member of the school's marching band. He has an older brother, Jason Thomas "Tom" Fischbach (born 1987), an artist and author of the webcomic Twokinds. While Tom Fischbach is featured in some videos, he mostly refrains from allowing his face to be filmed. His maternal grandfather was born in what is now North Korea; Fischbach explored his Korean family history along with his mother in the 2022 documentary Markiplier From North Korea.

Fischbach studied biomedical engineering at the University of Cincinnati, but dropped out to pursue his YouTube career.

On June 19, 2018, Fischbach's step-niece, Miranda Cracraft, was killed in a car accident at the age of 19. On June 26, 2018, Fischbach released a video with her father, thanking his fanbase for their support. Through GoFundMe, he raised more than $79,000 for Cracraft's funeral.

Political views
While not endorsing a specific political party, Fischbach described himself as a "liberal". He has expressed support for universal health care and stricter gun control following the Stoneman Douglas High School shooting. Fischbach is an ally of the LGBT rights movement, having raised money for the Human Rights Campaign in one of his charity live streams. In 2020, he condemned the murder of George Floyd. In 2022, Fischbach opposed the overturning of Roe v. Wade, describing it as "an erosion of women's rights".

Filmography

Film

Television and web series

Video games

Awards and nominations

See also
 List of YouTubers

References

External links

 
 
 

1989 births
Living people
20th-century American people
21st-century American male actors
21st-century American people
21st-century philanthropists
American people of German descent
American people of Korean descent
American people of North Korean descent
American YouTubers
Charity fundraisers (people)
English-language YouTube channels
Gaming-related YouTube channels
Gaming YouTubers
Internet memes
Internet memes introduced in 2014
Let's Players
OnlyFans creators
People from Cincinnati
People from Los Angeles
People from Honolulu
Revelmode people
Twitch (service) streamers
Video game commentators
YouTube channels launched in 2012
YouTube vloggers